Toufik Zerara (born 3 February 1986 in Mulhouse) is a footballer currently playing for CR Belouizdad in the Algerian Ligue Professionnelle 1. Born in France, he represented that nation at youth level but then opted to represent Algeria.

Career

Youth career
He began his football career in the youth side for FC Kingersheim and joined later to the cult club FC Mulhouse.

Professional career
Zerara began his professional career with the second team of FC Sochaux-Montbéliard who was promoted to the Ligue 1 team in 2006. After one year without a game in the Ligue 1 for Sochaux signed for Jupiler League club K.F.C. Germinal Beerschot. He played in only season for G.B.A. seven games and joined now to Al Dhafra Club in the UAE League during the 2008–09 season and was released by Emirati club Dhafra a few months ago.
On 12 January 2012 Zerara signed for Algerian club JSM Bejaia. On 28 January 2012 he made his debut for the club as a starter in a league game against CS Constantine,

Falkirk
He then signed for Scottish Premier League club Falkirk in November 2009; although this was outside of the transfer window, Zerara was able to sign as a free agent. On 6 January 2010 Zerara left the club after rejecting a contract extension which did not meet his wage demands.

International career
Zerara is a former France national under-21 football team member, played in 2007 only one game for his country.

References

External links
 

1986 births
Living people
Footballers from Mulhouse
Association football midfielders
French footballers
FC Sochaux-Montbéliard players
Beerschot A.C. players
Falkirk F.C. players
Scottish Premier League players
Belgian Pro League players
French sportspeople of Algerian descent
French expatriate footballers
Expatriate footballers in Belgium
Expatriate footballers in the United Arab Emirates
Expatriate footballers in Scotland
Algerian expatriate sportspeople in the United Arab Emirates
JSM Béjaïa players
Al Dhafra FC players
ES Sétif players
Algerian Ligue Professionnelle 1 players
Algerian expatriate sportspeople in Scotland
Algerian expatriate sportspeople in Belgium
French expatriate sportspeople in Scotland
French expatriate sportspeople in Belgium
French expatriate sportspeople in the United Arab Emirates
Algeria A' international footballers
Algerian footballers
UAE Pro League players